Wang Zhengyi (courtesy name: Zibin / 子斌,) (1844–1900) was a martial artist during the late Qing dynasty, hailing from Cangzhou, Hebei. He was of Hui Muslim ethnicity. Being the fifth by seniority of his master's students, Wang came to be called Wang Wu (i.e. Wang the fifth). His use of the dadao (Chinese greatsword) would lead to him earning the sobriquet by which he is best known, Dadao Wang Wu (sometimes rendered in English as Broadsword Wang Wu or Great Sword Wang Wu). Liang Qichao also called him the Hero of Yānzhào from the traditional name for Hebei.

Life
In the fifth year of the Guangxu Emperor's reign (1879), Wang opened the Shunyuan Protection Agency just outside Beijing's Zhengyangmen. The agency was a secure courier business which served a broad area, from Shanhai Pass in the north to Huai'an (Jiangsu) in the south. Wang Wu was chivalrous in nature and became friends with members of the reform movement, including a young Tan Sitong to whom he taught martial arts. In 1898 with the failure of the Hundred Days' Reform, Wang and Tan Sitong attempted to rescue the imprisoned Guangxu Emperor, but failed. Following Tan Sitong's execution, Wang recovered Tan's body for burial.

In some folklore accounts, which have become the basis of subsequent films and dramas, Wang storms the execution ground in an attempted rescue but Tan Sitong refuses to leave, saying that in the past reform in China has failed because no one was willing to make the necessary sacrifices, and that if a sacrifice of blood be needed then it should begin with his own.

Death
Wang Wu died in 1900 from bullet wounds sustained whilst fighting the Eight-Nation Alliance during the Boxer Rebellion, his corpse was beheaded and the head hung up for display, his remains were stolen away by Huo Yuanjia for burial.

Cultural references
Film
1950: 
1951: 
1973: 
1985: 
1993: Blade of Fury
Television
1971: Dadao Wang Wu (Taiwan Television drama)
1976: The Legend of the Heroic Knights-Dadao Wang Wu (TVB drama)
1976: Top Ten Assassins-Dadao Wang Wu (Rediffusion Television drama)
1999: Ten Tigers Of Guangdong (Asia Television drama series)
2002: Huo Yuanjia (2001 TV series)
2003: Find the Light (TVB drama series)
2008: Huo Yuanjia (2008 TV series)
2020: Heroes (TV Series Martial Arts)
Fiction
1991 Beijing Fayuán Temple (北京法源寺)

References

External links
Cultural China article

Further reading
Liu Pengnian 劉鵬年 (1914). "Ji Dadao Wang Wu" 記大刀王五 ("Records of Great Sword Wang the Fifth"),  Yuxian lu 娛閒錄, vol. 5: 7081–7082.

19th-century Chinese people
Chinese Muslims
Hui people
Chinese warriors
1854 births
1900 deaths
People from Cangzhou
Chinese folklore
Chinese martial artists
Security guards
Sportspeople from Hebei